Richard Bagwell (9 December 1840 – 4 December 1918) was a noted historian of the Stuart and Tudor  periods in Ireland, and a political commentator with strong Unionist convictions.
He was the eldest son of John Bagwell, M.P. for Clonmel from 1857 to 1874. His son John Philip Bagwell followed the family tradition in politics becoming a Senator in the government of the Irish Free State in 1923.

Academic career 

Bagwell was educated at Harrow and Oxford in England and called to the Bar, being admitted to Inner Temple in 1866. He was the author of Ireland  Under the Tudors, 3 vols. (1885-1890) and Ireland Under the Stuarts, 3 vols. (1909–10), in recognition for which he was given the honorary degree of Litt. D. by Dublin University in 1913 and that of D.Litt. by Oxford University in 1917. He also wrote the historical entry on ‘Ireland’ for the Encyclopædia Britannica (Chicago 1911).

Politics 

Bagwell was a Commissioner on National Education between 1905 and 1918 and a member of the Patriotic Union (Southern Unionists). He held the position of High Sheriff of County Tipperary in 1869. He was a Justice of the Peace  for County Tipperary (and later for Waterford), and held the office of Deputy Lieutenant of  Tipperary. He was also Special Local Government Commissioner between 1898 and 1903 and President of the Borstal Association of Ireland.

Personal life 

Bagwell married Harriet Philippa Joscelyn (née Newton) on 9 January 1873. The couple had one son, John Philip Bagwell, and three daughters, Emily Georgiana, Margaret and Lilla Minnie. He died 4 December 1918 at Marlfield.

Works

Ireland under the Tudors 

 – 1534 to 1558
 – 1558 to 1578
 – 1579 to 1603

Ireland under the Stuarts 

 – 1603 to 1642
 – 1642 to 1660
 – 1660 to 1690

Contributions to the Dictionary of National Biography 

Bagwell was a prolific contributor to the DNB. Among many others he wrote:

Contributions to the Encyclopaedia Britannica 11th Edition 

Bagwell contributed one signed article:

Bibliography

See also

 Clonmel Borstal
 Marlfield, Clonmel

References 

 
 Richard Bagwell (thePeerage.com)

External links
 
 

1840 births
1918 deaths
People from Clonmel
19th-century Irish historians
20th-century Irish historians
Richard
High Sheriffs of Tipperary
People educated at Harrow School
Alumni of the University of Oxford